The siege of Antwerp took place during the War of the Sixth Coalition and lasted from 14 January 1814 to 4 May 1814.

Background
After the German campaign of 1813, Napoleon had to retreat back across the Rhine. Whereas the two armies of Blücher and Schwarzenberg invaded France and marched on Paris, a third allied army under Bernadotte entered the Low Countries.

In January 1814 Napoleon appointed the old republican Lazare Carnot as governor of Antwerp. The 10,000 men garrison was composed of troops from I Corps, and the Young Guard, including a 500-strong battalion of Irish troops.

Siege
After the French defeat at the Battle of Hoogstraten (11 January 1814), Carnot retreated to the fortified city and the Antwerp Citadel, which was then besieged first by British
and up to the end by Prussian forces. The French garrison under Lazare Carnot, aided by a French naval flotilla under Missiessy, resisted the Allied siege and only surrendered the city after Louis XVIII of France signed an armistice upon Napoleon's abdication.

Notes

References

Further reading
 
 
 
 

1814 in France
Sieges of the Napoleonic Wars
Conflicts in 1814
Siege
Antwerp